Events in the year 1865 in Argentina.

Incumbents
 President: Bartolomé Mitre
 Vice President: Marcos Paz

Governors
 Buenos Aires Province: Mariano Saavedra
 Mendoza Province: Carlos González
 Santa Fe Province: Patricio Cullen then Nicasio Oroño

Vice Governors
Buenos Aires Province: vacant

Events
 March 5 – establishment of Bragado Partido
 May 1 – Treaty of the Triple Alliance
 July 9 – establishment of Nueve de Julio Partido
 July 19 – establishment of Ayacucho Partido, General Lavalle Partido, Necochea Partido, Tapalqué Partido, Tordillo Partido and Lincoln Partido
 August 5 – establishment of Chacabuco Partido

Births
 April 26 – Luis Dellepiane, civil engineer, militarist and politician

Deaths

References

 
1860s in Argentina
History of Argentina (1852–1880)
Years of the 19th century in Argentina